Ron Fricke (born February 24, 1953) is an American film director and cinematographer, specializing in time-lapse photography and large format cinematography. He was the director of photography for Koyaanisqatsi (1982) and directed the purely cinematic non-verbal non-narrative feature Baraka (1992). He designed and used his own 65 mm camera equipment for Baraka and his later projects. He also directed the IMAX films Chronos (1985) and Sacred Site (1986). He also worked as cinematographer for parts of the film Star Wars: Episode III – Revenge of the Sith (he was hired to shoot the eruption of Mount Etna in Sicily for use in scenes of the volcanic planet Mustafar). 

The sequel to Baraka, Samsara, premiered at the Toronto International Film Festival in September 2011, and had its U.S. premiere on August 24, 2012.

Fricke writes about his work:

Filmography

As director
Chronos (1985)
Sacred Site (1986)
Baraka (1992)
Samsara (2011)

As cinematographer
Koyaanisqatsi (1982)
Atomic Artist (1982)
Chronos (1985)
Sacred Site (1986)
Baraka (1992)
Samsara (2011)

See also
 Godfrey Reggio, director of Koyaanisqatsi

References

External links
 
 Koyaanisqatsi
 Chronos
 Baraka
 Samsara
 The official site for the films SAMSARA and BARAKA

1953 births
American documentary filmmakers
American cinematographers
American film directors
Living people